Bni Oual is a small town and rural commune in Sidi Kacem Province, Rabat-Salé-Kénitra, Morocco. At the time of the 2004 census, the commune had a total population of 8480 people living in 1328 households.

References

Populated places in Sidi Kacem Province
Rural communes of Rabat-Salé-Kénitra